Logan Thomas Clark (born February 16, 1985 in Rochester, Minnesota) is an American professional mixed martial artist who has fought in the UFC and has also competed for the World Extreme Cagefighting and World Victory Road.

Biography and fighting career
Born in Southeastern Minnesota, Clark was raised on a farm north of Dover, MN. In 1987, at the age of 1, Clark's father died leaving his mother to raise the family. Clark has 3 siblings: Tyrel Clark, Doron Clark, and Amanda Clark. In 1993, his family moved to Eyota, MN.

After graduating from Dover-Eyota High School, where he was coached by Minnesota Wrestling Hall of Fame coach Mike Mazzitelli, Clark attended Hamline University in Saint Paul, MN for one year and was a member of the football and track teams. He then transferred to Saint Cloud State University where he was a part of the wrestling team. After one semester, he left to attend Rochester Community and Technical College for one semester before transferring to Winona State University in the fall of 2005. He graduated with a Bachelor's Degree in Communication Arts & Literature with ambitions of being an English teacher and has successfully an English teacher at Dover-Eyota High School.

Clark is a mixed martial artist and a coach with Compound MMA, a team of fighters that compete in mixed martial arts (MMA). His training time is split between Compound MMA and the Minnesota Martial Arts Academy in Brooklyn Center, MN. Clark's MMA style is freestyle wrestling and ground and pound and as of August 2012 he had an MMA record of 17-5, he has only been knocked unconscious once in his career, against journeyman and current Bellator MMA fighter Jason Guida brother of current UFC veteran and former Strikeforce champion Clay Guida.

Mixed martial arts record

|-
| Loss
| align=center| 18–6
| Lucio Linhares
| Submission (rear-naked choke)
| Fight Festival 33
| 
| align=center| 2
| align=center| 4:30
| Helsinki, Finland
| 
|-
| Win
| align=center| 18–5
| Ryan Scheeper
| Submission (punches)
| |Brutaal - Fight Night
| 
| align=center| 1
| align=center| 0:39
| Rochester, Minnesota, United States
| 
|-
| Win
| align=center| 17–5
| Jake Doerr
| Submission (triangle choke)
| 3 River Throwdown - Onalaska
| 
| align=center| 2
| align=center| 1:08
| Onalaska, Wisconsin, United States
| 
|-
| Win
| align=center| 16–5
| Marcus Sursa
| Submission (armbar)
| Brutaal - Rochester
| 
| align=center| 1
| align=center| 2:03
| Rochester, Minnesota, United States
| 
|-
| Win
| align=center| 15–5
| B.J. Lacy
| Submission (rear-naked choke)
| CFX - Hostile
| 
| align=center| 3
| align=center| 1:33
| Morton, Minnesota, United States
| 
|-
| Loss
| align=center| 14–5
| Anthony Smith
| TKO (doctor stoppage)
| Seconds Out / Vivid MMA - Havoc at the Hyatt 2
|  
| align=center| 2
| align=center| 2:22
| Minneapolis, Minnesota, United States
| 
|-
| Win
| align=center| 14–4
| Shane DeZee
| Submission (hammerlock)
| Seconds Out / Vivid MMA - Havoc at the Hyatt: Clark vs. DeZee
| 
| align=center| 1
| align=center| 1:10
| Minneapolis, Minnesota, United States
| 
|-
| Win
| align=center| 13–4
| Chris Barden
| TKO (punches)
| Gladiators MMA
| 
| align=center| 1
| align=center| 1:20
| Rochester, Minnesota, United States
| 
|-
| Loss
| align=center| 12–4
| Jason Guida
| KO (punches)
| Fight Nation: Guida vs. Clark
| 
| align=center| 1
| align=center| 0:07
| Rochester, Minnesota, United States
| Fought at Heavyweight
|-
| Loss
| align=center| 12–3
| Jorge Santiago
| Submission (arm triangle choke)
| World Victory Road Presents: Sengoku 5
| 
| align=center| 2
| align=center| 3:35
| Tokyo, Japan
| 
|-
| Loss
| align=center| 12–2
| Kazuo Misaki
| Decision (unanimous)
| World Victory Road Presents: Sengoku 3
| 
| align=center| 3
| align=center| 5:00
| Saitama, Japan
| 
|-
| Win
| align=center| 12–1
| Scott Harper
| TKO (punches) 
| WEC 33: Marshall vs. Stann
| 
| align=center| 1
| align=center| 4:37
| Las Vegas, Nevada, United States
| 
|-
| Loss
| align=center| 11–1
| Eric Schambari
| Decision (unanimous) 
| WEC 29
| 
| align=center| 3
| align=center| 5:00
| Las Vegas, Nevada, United States
| 
|-
| Win
| align=center| 11–0
| Blas Avena
| TKO (elbows)
| WEC 25
| 
| align=center| 3
| align=center| 4:23
| Las Vegas, Nevada, United States
| 
|-
| Win
| align=center| 10–0
| Steve Byrnes
| Decision (unanimous)
| UFC Fight Night: Sanchez vs. Riggs
| 
| align=center| 3
| align=center| 5:00
| San Diego, California, United States
| 
|-
| Win
| align=center| 9–0
| Ryan Willete
| Decision (unanimous)
| Extreme Challenge 72
| 
| align=center| 3
| align=center| 5:00
| Medina, Minnesota, United States
| 
|-
| Win
| align=center| 8–0
| Chuck Parmelee
| TKO (punches)
| The Cage Inc.
| 
| align=center| 1
| align=center| 2:51
| South Dakota, United States
| 
|-
| Win
| align=center| 7–0
| B.J. Lacy
| Decision (unanimous)
| UCS 15 - Battle at the Barn
| 
| align=center| 3
| align=center| 3:00
| Rochester, Minnesota, United States
| 
|-
| Win
| align=center| 6–0
| Dave Morin
| N/A
| EFX - Fury
| 
| align=center| 1
| align=center| N/A
| Maplewood, Minnesota, United States
| 
|-
| Win
| align=center| 5–0
| Brandon Nelson
| TKO (punches)
| UCS 13 - Battle at the Barn
| 
| align=center| 1
| align=center| N/A
| Minnesota, United States
| 
|-
| Win
| align=center| 4–0
| Fidel Zapata
| TKO (punches)
| UCS 12 - Battle at the Barn
| 
| align=center| 1
| align=center| N/A
| Minnesota, United States
| 
|-
| Win
| align=center| 3–0
| Noah Liebenauer
| TKO (punches)
| Coliseum 
| 
| align=center| 1
| align=center| 0:58
| Rochester, Minnesota, United States
| 
|-
| Win
| align=center| 2–0
| Paul Hersch
| TKO (punches)
| UCS - Ultimate Lacrosse 1
| 
| align=center| 1
| align=center| N/A
| La Crosse, Wisconsin, United States
| 
|-
| Win
| align=center| 1–0
| Caleb Steiger
| Submission (armbar)
| Ring Warriors - Xtreme Fight Night  
|  
| align=center| 1
| align=center| 1:30
| La Crosse, Wisconsin, United States
|

See also
 Mixed martial arts

References

External links
 Official website
 

 WEC profile
 
 Minnesota Martial Arts Academy

1985 births
American male mixed martial artists
Mixed martial artists from Minnesota
Middleweight mixed martial artists
Living people
Winona State University alumni
Hamline University alumni
Hamline Pipers football players
Sportspeople from Rochester, Minnesota
People from Eyota, Minnesota
Ultimate Fighting Championship male fighters